Chuck White (died 2019) was an American basketball coach.

Career
White moved to Alaska in 1965, leaving the University of Idaho.

During his career, White coached the Anchorage high school basketball teams and led them successfully in 18 state championships, fourteen times at East Anchorage High School and four times at West Anchorage High School.

White spent the most of his career transforming the East Thunderbirds into the most successful club in Alaska.

In 2011, he was inducted into Alaska Sports Hall of Fame. He was also included in Alaska High School Hall of Fame. By the win percentage, he is included in top-10 all time basketball coaches.

White died in 2019 at the age of 78.

Awards
 Alaska Sports Hall of Fame

References

2019 deaths
American men's basketball coaches
Date of birth missing (living people)
High school basketball coaches in Alaska